Remi (stylised in all caps) were an Australian hip hop duo consisting of rapper Remi Kolawole and producer Justin "Sensible J" Smith. Originally a trio, which included producer-engineer Daniel "Dutch" Siwes, the group released four full-length albums as well as two mix-tapes and four extended plays (EPs). Their 2014 release Raw x Infinity garnered critical acclaim, winning the Australian Music Prize, while their third album Divas & Demons (2016)—their first as a duo—was nominated for the 2017 ARIA Award for Best Urban Album. The act's final album, Fried (May 2021), coincided with the dissolution of Remi as a duo.

History 

Remi were formed in Melbourne as a three-piece by Aderemi "Remi" Matthew Kolawole on lead vocals, Daniel James "Dutch" Siwes on co-production and engineering and Justin Scott "Sensible J" Smith on drums and production. Kolawole was born in Canberra to a Tasmanian mother and Nigerian father. He took classical piano lessons while growing up and started rapping on a dare from a friend. Siwes and Smith were neighbours and jammed in various bands in the late 1990s. The pair mentored Kolawole early in his solo career.

The trio's first recordings appeared in 2011, "Apollo 13" and "Ape", as free downloads through Kolawole's Bandcamp page. "Ape" was also the lead single from Remi's first album, Regular People Shit, which was self-released via House of Beige in 2012. "Ape" received high rotation on national youth radio station, Triple J. Remi's 2013 singles, "Sangria" and "Saggin" from the trio's mix-tape F.Y.G. Act 1, also gained consistent radio airplay, contributing to Remi winning that year's Triple J Unearthed Artist of the Year award.

The trio's second album, Raw x Infinity, was released in June 2014 to critical acclaim. Backed by the singles "Livin" and "Tyson"—the latter a boastful nod to boxer Mike Tyson—the release was nominated for Australian Album of the Year in the J Awards of 2014. In March 2015, Remi were awarded the coveted $30,000 Australian Music Prize for Raw x Infinity, adding to the record's growing list of accolades. 

Slimming to a duo in 2016, Kolawole and Smith released Divas & Demons, Remi's third album, which peaked in the top 10 of the ARIA Charts. The following year, the record was nominated for the 2017 ARIA Award for Best Urban Album. 

The duo's final album, Fried, was released in May 2021 after being postponed for more than a year due to the COVID-19 pandemic in Australia. The pair also announced their split during the week of the album's release.

Discography

Studio albums

Extended plays

Mixtapes

Singles

Music videos

Awards and nominations

AIR Awards
The Australian Independent Record Awards (commonly known informally as AIR Awards) is an annual awards night to recognise, promote and celebrate the success of Australia's Independent Music sector.

|-
| rowspan="3"| AIR Awards of 2014
| Raw X Infinity
| Best Independent Hip Hop/Urban Album
| 
|-
| rowspan="2"| themselves
| Breakthrough Independent Artist
| 
|-
| Carlton Dry Global Music Grant
| 
|-
| AIR Awards of 2017
| Divas and Demons
| Best Independent Hip Hop/Urban Album
| 
|-

Australian Music Prize
The Australian Music Prize (the AMP) is an annual award of $30,000 given to an Australian band or solo artist in recognition of the merit of an album released during the year of award.

|-
| 2014
| Raw X Infinity
| Australian Music Prize
| 
|-

ARIA Music Awards
The Australian Recording Industry Association Music Awards (commonly known informally as ARIA Music Awards or ARIA Awards) is an annual series of awards nights celebrating the Australian music industry, put on by the Australian Recording Industry Association (ARIA)

|-
| 2017
| Divas & Demons
| Best Urban Album
| 
|-

J Award
The J Awards are an annual series of Australian music awards that were established by the Australian Broadcasting Corporation's youth-focused radio station Triple J. They commenced in 2005.

|-
| J Awards of 2013
|themselves
| Unearthed Artist of the Year
| 
|-
| J Awards of 2014
|Raw X Infinity 
| Australian Album of the Year
| 
|-

Music Victoria Awards
The Music Victoria Awards, are an annual awards night celebrating Victorian music. They commenced in 2005.

|-
| rowspan="2"|2014
| himself
| Best Emerging Artist
| 
|-
| Raw x Infinity
| Best Hip Hop Album
| 
|-
| 2016
| himself
| Best Male Artist
| 
|-
| rowspan="2"| 2017
| himself
| Best Male Artist
| 
|-
| Divas & Demons
| Best Hip Hop Album
| 
|-
| 2019
| himself
| Best Hip Hop Act
| 
|}

National Live Music Awards
The National Live Music Awards (NLMAs) are a broad recognition of Australia's diverse live industry, celebrating the success of the Australian live scene. The awards commenced in 2016.

|-
| National Live Music Awards of 2016
| Remi
| Live Hip Hop Act of the Year
|

References

Living people
Year of birth missing (living people)